This is a list of the National Register of Historic Places listings in Gonzales County, Texas.

This is intended to be a complete list of properties and districts listed on the National Register of Historic Places in Gonzales County, Texas. There are three districts and eight individual properties listed on the National Register in the county. Six individually listed properties are Recorded Texas Historic Landmarks including three that are also State Antiquities Landmarks. One district contains additional Recorded Texas Historic Landmarks and State Antiquities Landmarks.

Current listings

The publicly disclosed locations of National Register properties and districts may be seen in a mapping service provided.

|}

See also

National Register of Historic Places listings in Texas
Recorded Texas Historic Landmarks in Gonzales County

References

External links

Registered Historic Places
Gonzales County
Buildings and structures in Gonzales County, Texas